The House at 132 Baltic Circle is a historic home in the Davis Islands neighborhood of Tampa, Florida, United States. It is located at 132 Baltic Circle. On August 3, 1989, it was added to the U.S. National Register of Historic Places.

References

External links
 Hillsborough County listings at National Register of Historic Places

Houses in Tampa, Florida
History of Tampa, Florida
Houses on the National Register of Historic Places in Hillsborough County, Florida
Mediterranean Revival architecture of Davis Islands, Tampa, Florida